The 1983 Individual Long Track World Championship was the 13th edition of the FIM speedway Individual Long Track World Championship. The event was held on 18 September 1983 in Mariánské Lázně in the Czech Republic which was Czechoslovakia at the time.
The world title was won by Shawn Moran of the United States.

Final Classification 

 E = eliminated (no further ride)
 f = fell
 ef = engine failure
 x = excluded

References 

1983
Speedway competitions in the Czech Republic
Sport in Czechoslovakia
Sports competitions in Czechoslovakia
Motor
Motor